Shitala Pandey, better known as Sameer Anjaan, is an Indian lyricist, writing songs such as "Mujhe Raat Din Bas", predominantly in Hindi language films. He is a Guinness World Record holder for writing the most songs. He was awarded this honor on 17 February 2016.

His father is the famed Hindi lyricist, Lalji "Anjaan" Pandey. He has won three Filmfare Awards.

Biography

Sameer, officially named Shitala Pandey, but commonly known by his nickname Rajan, was born near Banaras, Uttar Pradesh. He earned a Master of Commerce degree at the Banaras Hindu University in Varanasi, and started a new position as a bank officer at the Central Bank of India. However, a few days after joining, he left the job because he "knew the bank was not my world". To pursue a career as a lyricist, he moved to Mumbai in 1980.

Career
Sameer started his career as a lyricist in 1983 with the film Bekhabar (1983). The first film song he recorded was "Maar Ke Kataaree Mar Jaibe" for the Bhojpuri film Bairi Saawan (1984) sung by Suresh Wadkar and Preeti Sagar. In 1990, he came into prominence with songs in films such as Dil and Aashiqui. He won his first Filmfare Award for the song "Nazar Ke Saamne" in the latter. In the following decades he emerged as a leading lyricist in Hindi films, writing the lyrics for over 500 films (4,000 songs).

According to Sameer, his inspirations have been lyricists Majrooh Sultanpuri and Anand Bakshi, and his father, Anjaan. He has said on several occasions, "Whatever I am today is only because of my father."

Sameer won two additional Filmfare Awards in 1993 and 1994; one for the song "Teri Umeed Tera Intezaar" from the movie Deewana, and the second for the song "Ghunghat Ki Aad" from Hum Hain Rahi Pyar Ke. In 1998, he won Zee Cine Award for "Kuch Kuch Hota Hai" from Kuch Kuch Hota Hai. Some of his most successful songs include songs in films like Beta, Saajan, Raja Babu, Coolie No. 1, Raja Hindustani, Anjaam, Kuch Kuch Hota Hai, Fiza, Dhadkan, Kabhi Khushi Kabhie Gham, Devdas, Raaz, Dil Hai Tumhaara, Ishq Vishk, Dil Maange More, Tere Naam, Asambhav, Fida, No Entry, Aksar, Dhoom 2, Saawariya, Race, Damadamm!, Housefull 2, Rowdy Rathore, Son of Sardaar, Dabangg 2, Balmaa, and more.

The music composer duo Nadeem-Shravan chose Sameer as their lyricist for most of their works. Sameer authored more than 950 under the music composition of famous music composer duo Anand–Milind. Sameer has also worked with other music directors like Rajesh Roshan, Uttam Singh, Ilayaraja, Jatin–Lalit, Dilip Sen-Sameer Sen, Nikhil-Vinay, Anu Malik, Aadesh Shrivastava, Anand Raj Anand, Viju Shah, A. R. Rahman, Vidyasagar, Himesh Reshammiya, Ismail Darbar, Bappi Lahiri, Vishal–Shekhar, Monty Sharma, Shankar–Ehsaan–Loy, Sajid–Wajid, Pritam, Sanjeev-Darshan, Sachin–Jigar, and Adnan Sami.

Personal life

Sameer is married to Anita Pandey and the couple have three children: daughters Sanchita and Suchita, and son Siddhesh. His mother, Indira Pandey, lives with them.

A biography, Sameer – A Way with Words'' by Derek Bose, was released by Amitabh Bachchan in 2007.

Filmography as lyricist 
Due to Sameer's large number of works, this is an incomplete list.

Albums

Awards and nominations

References

Living people
Year of birth missing (living people)
20th-century Indian composers
21st-century Indian composers
Banaras Hindu University alumni
Indian lyricists
Musicians from Varanasi